Michael C. Vollmin (born 13 May 1993) is an American-Swiss professional ice hockey defenseman who is currently playing with Genève-Servette HC of the National League (NL). He previously played with SC Langenthal of the Swiss League (SL).

Playing career

Junior
A defenseman, Vollmin has dual citizenship in the United States and Switzerland, parts of his family come from Switzerland. He played ice hockey at New Hampton School in New Hampshire and for the Northern Cyclones of the Alberta Junior Hockey League before enrolling at Babson College in 2012. In his four year at Babson, Vollmin received New England Hockey Conference (NEHC) first team honors in 2015 and 2016 as well as ECAC East all-conference first team honors and ACHA/CCM All-America East second team recognition in 2015. He also made the 2015 New England Hockey Writers Association All-Star team.

Professional
He inked his first pro contract with SC Langenthal of the Swiss second division Swiss League (SL) in March 2016. Vollmin made his SL debut in the 2016–17 season and eventually won the SL title with SC Langenthal. He went on to play 87 regular season games over 2 seasons, as well as 27 playoffs games with SC Langenthal.

In February 2018, Genève-Servette HC of the Swiss top-flight NL announced to have signed Vollmin to a two-year deal starting with the 2018–19 season and through the 2019–20 season. On June 15, 2020, Völlmin was signed to a two-year contract extension by Servette through to the end of the 2021/22 campaign.

References

External links 
 

1993 births
Living people
Babson College alumni
Genève-Servette HC players
SC Langenthal players
Ice hockey people from North Carolina
Sportspeople from North Carolina
American men's ice hockey defensemen